Keta may refer to:
 Keta, a town in the Volta Region of Ghana
 Keta (Ghana parliament constituency), one of the constituencies represented in the Parliament of Ghana
 KETA, an educational television station licensed in Oklahoma City, Oklahoma, United States
 Keta Municipal District, one of the eighteen districts in the Volta Region of Ghana
 Keta salmon (Oncorhynchus keta), a species of anadromous fish in the salmon family
 Korea Electronic Travel Authorization
 Lake Keta, a large freshwater lake in Krasnoyarsk Krai, Russia
 Keta Minaj, Dutch drag queen